HMS Zephyr was a 14-gun Crocus-class brig of the Royal Navy built by Nicholas Diddams at Portsmouth Dockyard and launched there in 1809. During her service she captured two armed vessels. The Navy sold her in 1818 for breaking up.

Career
Commander Francis George Dickins, commissioned Zephyr for the Downs and Channel station in June 1809.

Shortly after midnight on 15 November 1810  captured the French privateer lugger Barbier de Seville. At daylight Zephyr, came up. Zephyr assisted with the removal of the prisoners.

Zephyr was in sight on 3 February 1811 when  and   captured the privateer lugger Braconnier.

On 8 February 1811 Zephyr captured the French lugger privateer Victoire, of 16 guns and 68 men. Lloyd's List reported Victoire of 16 guns and 80 men, was from Dieppe, and that Zephyr had taken her into the Downs. Victoire had captured Mary, which had been returning to London from Surinam prior to herself being captured.

Commander Thomas Cuthbert Hichens was appointed to command of Zephyr on 3 August 1811. On 10 December 1812 Zephyr captured the United States letter of marque schooner Antelope, of 10 guns and 32 men. Antelope had been bound to Bordeaux with a cargo from New York. Antelope arrived at Falmouth on 19 December.  

Commander Hichens was promoted to post captain in 7 June 1814. Captain Richard Creyke recommissioned Zephyr in July on the Portsmouth station. He was promoted to post captain on 19 December. 

Commander George F. Rich recommissioned her in December. He sailed Zephyr to Saint Helena. She returned to Plymouth on 28 September. She was paid off in June 1816.  

Commander John Cook Carpenter commanded Zephyrin 1817.

Fate
The "Principal Officers and Commissioners of His Majesty's Navy" offered Zephyr for sale on 5 June 1817 at Plymouth. She finally sold on 29 January 1818 to Thomas Pitman. for £820 for breaking up.

Notes

Citations

References
 
 
 

1809 ships
Brigs of the Royal Navy